Timur Morgunov (born 12 October 1996) is a Russian track and field athlete specialising in the pole vault. As an Authorised Neutral Athlete, he won the silver medal at the 2018 European Athletics Championships. He did not compete at the 2020 Summer Olympics as he was not granted neutral status.

References

 

1996 births
Living people
People from Kopeysk
Sportspeople from Chelyabinsk Oblast
Russian male pole vaulters
Russian Athletics Championships winners
Diamond League winners